Patrick James O'Neill (born February 9, 1971) is a former American football punter in the National Football League (NFL) who played for the New England Patriots, Chicago Bears, and New York Jets. He played college football at Syracuse University.

References 

1971 births
Living people
Players of American football from Illinois
American football punters
Syracuse Orange football players
New England Patriots players
Chicago Bears players
New York Jets players